The 2008 National Women Football Championship was the fourth season of the National Women Football Championship, the top-tier of women's football in Pakistan.

The tournament took place from 20 to 30 August 2008 at Jinnah Sports Stadium in Islamabad, and was organized by the Islamabad Football Association under directives of the Pakistan Football Federation.

Young Rising Stars won their first title by beating the WAPDA 5-3 on penalties in the final after the match had ended goalless in regular time.

Teams 
Thirteen teams took park in the event:

 Azad Jammu & Kashmir
 Balochistan
 Diya
 Higher Education Commission
 Islamabad
 NWFP
 Pakistan Police
 Punjab
 Sindh
 Sports Sciences
 Vehari United
 WAPDA
 Young Rising Stars

Knockout stage

Quarter-finals

Semi-finals

Third-place match

Final

References 

2008 in Pakistani sport
National Women Football Championship seasons